Constantin Pîrvulescu (November 10, 1895, Olănești, Vâlcea County – July 11, 1992, Roman) was a Romanian communist politician, one of the founders of the Romanian Communist Party (PCR), who, as time went on, became an active opponent of leader Nicolae Ceaușescu.  Briefly expelled from the Party in 1960, he was re-admitted and elected to the Party Revision Committee in 1974.

In April 1944, acting on the orders of the still imprisoned Gheorghe Gheorghiu-Dej, Pîrvulescu along with Iosif Rangheț and Emil Bodnăraș captured and deposed PCR general secretary Ștefan Foriș at gunpoint forcing him to resign his position due to charges by Dej that he was a police informer. Pîrvulescu, Rangheț and Bodnăraș, as a troika, replaced him as a provisional secretariat until Dej escaped from prison and took up the position of general secretary of the party in September 1944. 

In November 1979, at the 12th Party Congress, Pîrvulescu took the floor advocating against the re-election of Ceaușescu to the party leadership, accusing him of putting personal interests ahead of those of party and nation. He also accused the congress of neglecting the country's real problems, and being preoccupied with glorifying Ceaușescu. This unprecedented attack came from a man who was a lifelong communist, with a lifelong association with Soviet-style communism (he was the only member of the Central Committee to oppose Nikita Khrushchev's withdrawal of Soviet troops in 1958). Likewise, being 84 years of age, personal ambition could not be a motivating factor for this speech. Thus, the Western press considered his remarks to be proof of dissatisfaction within the Party's ranks. Pîrvulescu was kicked out of the room, stripped of his position as delegate to the congress and placed under strict supervision and house arrest. On January 16, 1980 he was excluded from the PCR.

In March 1989 he was one of the signatories of the open letter known as Scrisoarea celor șase – "The Letter of the Six", together with five other communist dignitaries (Gheorghe Apostol, Alexandru Bârlădeanu, Grigore Răceanu, Corneliu Mănescu, and Silviu Brucan). The document, which was immediately broadcast on Radio Free Europe and Voice of America, was a left-wing critique of Ceaușescu's policies, and led to the swift arrest and interrogation of the signatories by the Securitate, and then to their assignment to forced residence at various locations.

He was married to Suzana Pîrvulescu (1898–1942), herself a PCR activist who was imprisoned from 1936 to 1939.

He died in 1992, almost three years after Ceaușescu was overthrown in the Romanian Revolution.

References

External links

 

1895 births
1992 deaths
Members of the Great National Assembly
Presidents of the Great National Assembly
Members of the Chamber of Deputies (Romania)
People of the Russian Civil War
People from Vâlcea County
General Secretaries of the Romanian Communist Party
Romanian dissidents
Romanian prisoners and detainees